In category theory, a monoidal monad  is a monad  on a monoidal category  such that the functor  is a lax monoidal functor and the natural transformations  and  are monoidal natural transformations. In other words,  is equipped with coherence maps  and  satisfying certain properties (again: they are lax monoidal), and the unit  and multiplication  are monoidal natural transformations.

All of the above can be compressed into the statement that a monoidal monad is a monad in the 2-category  of monoidal categories, lax monoidal functors, and monoidal natural transformations.

Opmonoidal Monads

Opmonoidal monads have been studied under various names.  Ieke Moerdijk introduced them as "Hopf monads", while in works of Bruguières and Virelizier they are called "bimonads", by analogy to "bialgebra", reserving the term "Hopf monad" for opmonoidal monads with an antipode, in analogy to "Hopf algebras".

An opmonoidal monad is a monad  in the 2-category  of  monoidal categories, oplax monoidal functors and monoidal natural transformations. That means a monad  on a monoidal category  together with coherence maps  and  satisfying three axioms that make an opmonoidal functor, and four more axioms that make the unit  and the multiplication  into opmonoidal natural transformations. Alternatively, an opmonoidal monad is a monad on a monoidal category such that the category of Eilenberg-Moore algebras has a monoidal structure for which the forgetful functor is strong monoidal.

An easy example for the monoidal category  of vector spaces is the monad , where  is a bialgebra. The multiplication and unit of  define the multiplication and unit of the monad, while the comultiplication and counit of  give rise to the opmonoidal structure. The algebras of this monad are right -modules, which one may tensor in the same way as their underlying vector spaces.

Properties
 The Kleisli category of a monoidal monad has a canonical monoidal structure, induced by the monoidal structure of the monad, and such that the free functor is strong monoidal.
 The Eilenberg-Moore category of an opmonoidal monad has a canonical monoidal structure such that the forgetful functor is strong monoidal. Thus, the 2-category  has Eilenberg-Moore objects for monads.

Examples
The following monads on the category of sets, with its cartesian monoidal structure, are monoidal monads:
 The power set monad . Indeed, there is a function , sending a pair  of subsets to the subset . This function is natural in X and Y. Together with the unique function  as well as the fact that  are monoidal natural transformations,   is established as a monoidal monad.
 The probability distributions (Giry) monad.

The following monads on the category of sets, with its cartesian monoidal structure, are not monoidal monads
 If  is a monoid, then  is a monad, but in general there is no reason to expect a monoidal structure on it (unless  is commutative).

References

Monoidal categories